2012–13 in Kenyan football may refer to:
 2012 in Kenyan football
 2013 in Kenyan football